Lovrečan may refer to:

 Lovrečan, Krapina-Zagorje County, a village near Zlatar Bistrica, Croatia
 Lovrečan, Varaždin County, a village near Ivanec, Croatia
 Veliki Lovrečan, a village near Cestica, Varaždin County, Croatia
 Mali Lovrečan, a village near Cestica, Varaždin County, Croatia